Pyotr Ivanovich Sumin (21 June 1946 – 6 January 2011) was the governor of Chelyabinsk Oblast of Russia. He was sequentially a member of the Communist Party of the Soviet Union, Communist Party of the Russian Federation and Political Party United Russia. 

In 1993 Sumin won the first election of the Head of Administration of Chelyabinsk Oblast, gaining more than 50% of the votes. However, the results of the elections were canceled, despite the decision of the Constitutional Court of Russia recognising legality of Sumin's election. Until October 1993 there were two administrations in the region, led by Pyotr Sumin and Vadim Solovyov respectively. In October 1993, after the dissolution of the Supreme Soviet, President Boris Yeltsin confirmed Solovyov's powers.

Sumin became governor of Chelyabinsk Oblast in December 1996 receiving 58% of the vote. He complained about nuclear waste in his region. Sumin was elected governor in 1996, taking office on 5 January 1997 and reelected in 2000.

In April 2005, following changes in the law, he was nominated for a third term by Russian President Vladimir Putin and unanimously confirmed by the Oblast assembly. In March 2010, Sumin said he would not apply for a new governor's term. He was succeeded by Mikhail Yurevich.

References

External links
Biography with photograph

1946 births
2011 deaths
People from Chelyabinsk Oblast
Second convocation members of the State Duma (Russian Federation)
South Ural State University alumni
Governors of Chelyabinsk Oblast
Communist Party of the Russian Federation members
United Russia politicians
21st-century Russian politicians
Recipients of the Order of Honour (Russia)